The Scottsdale Scorpions are a baseball team that plays in the East Division of the Arizona Fall League. They play their home games in Scottsdale, Arizona, at Scottsdale Stadium, which is also the spring training facility of the San Francisco Giants. The team was established in 1992 and has retained the Scorpions nickname through several location changes. The Scorpions have won three league championships, most recently in 2015.

History
In the fall of 1994, the team gained worldwide media attention, when Michael Jordan joined the Scorpions after playing his first minor league baseball season with the Double-A Birmingham Barons in Birmingham, Alabama.

The Scorpions won their first championship in 1996, against the Mesa Saguaros. The Scorpions reached the championship game in 2002, 2004, and 2005 but failed to win it. For the 2005 season, the team played its games in Surprise, Arizona, due to renovations of Scottsdale Stadium. The team returned to Scottsdale Stadium the following year, renamed as the Grand Canyon Scorpions. The team changed their name back to Scottsdale Scorpions for the 2007 season. The Scorpions won the league championship in 2010, their first in 14 years. They also won the championship in 2015.

Notable alumni

Dusty Baker, former outfielder and manager
Josh Bard, former catcher and current bench coach for the New York Yankees
Tim Tebow, retired National Football League quarterback and onetime minor league baseball player in the New York Mets organization
Ryan Braun, outfielder for the Milwaukee Brewers
Emmanuel Burriss, utility player for the Philadelphia Phillies
Terry Francona, manager of the Cleveland Indians
Nomar Garciaparra, former shortstop and current ESPN baseball analyst
Shawn Green, retired outfielder
Bryce Harper, outfielder for the Washington Nationals
Derek Jeter, retired shortstop for the New York Yankees and current CEO of the Miami Marlins
Michael Jordan, retired NBA player as part of the Chicago White Sox organization
Aaron Judge, outfielder for the New York Yankees
Scott Kingery (born 1994), player for the Philadelphia Phillies
James Loney, retired first baseman
Evan Longoria, third baseman for the San Francisco Giants
Russell Martin, catcher for the Toronto Blue Jays
Will Middlebrooks, retired third baseman, formerly of the Colorado Springs Sky Sox
Kendrys Morales, designated hitter for the Toronto Blue Jays.
Troy Percival, retired closing pitcher for the Los Angeles Angels of Anaheim
Albert Pujols, first baseman and designated hitter for the St. Louis Cardinals, formerly of the Los Angeles Dodgers and the Los Angeles Angels of Anaheim.
Scott Schoeneweis, retired pitcher
 Zack Thornton, pitcher
Mike Trout, outfielder for the Los Angeles Angels of Anaheim
Brandon Webb,  retired pitcher for the Arizona Diamondbacks
Gleyber Torres, second baseman for the New York Yankees
Dustin Pedroia, retired second baseman for the Boston Red Sox
Miguel Andújar, third baseman for the New York Yankees
Tyler Austin, first baseman for the Yokohama DeNA Baystars

Stenson Award

The Stenson Award was created in 2004 by the Arizona Fall League, in memory of Dernell Stenson, a Scorpions outfielder (Cincinnati Reds), who was killed in a carjacking on November 5, 2003.

Roster

See also
 Arizona Fall League#Results by season

References

External links

Arizona Fall League teams
Baseball teams established in 1992
Professional baseball teams in Arizona
Sports in Scottsdale, Arizona
1992 establishments in Arizona